La Fortuna is a Spanish-American adventure drama television miniseries. Directed by Alejandro Amenábar, and starring Álvaro Mel, Ana Polvorosa, Stanley Tucci, T'Nia Miller and Clarke Peters, among others, it is an adaptation of the 2018 graphic novel El tesoro del Cisne Negro by Paco Roca and Guillermo Corral. It premiered on 30 September 2021 on Movistar+.

Premise 
Álex Ventura is a young diplomat who ends up becoming the leader of a collective effort to recover an underwater shipwreck seized by Frank Wild, a treasure hunter.

Cast 
  as Álex Ventura, a young diplomat.
 Ana Polvorosa as Lucía Vallarta, a civil servant.
 Stanley Tucci as Frank Wild, a treasure hunter.
 T'Nia Miller as Susan McLean, a lawyer collaborating with Frank Wild.
 Clarke Peters as Jonas Pierce, a lawyer helping the Spanish Ministry of Culture.
 Karra Elejalde as Enrique Moliner, Spanish Minister of Culture.
 Manolo Solo as Horacio Valverde, a former legionary.
 Pedro Casablanc as Ambassador Arribas, the Spanish Ambassador in Washington DC.
 Blanca Portillo as Zeta.
 Indy Lewis as Amy Wild.
  as Mazas.

Production 
La Fortuna is an adaptation of the graphic novel El tesoro del Cisne Negro, by Paco Roca y Guillermo Corral, who were not directly involved in the screenplay. The miniseries was produced by Movistar+ together with AMC Studios, in collaboration with MOD Producciones. Directed by Alejandro Amenábar, it is the latter's television debut. Amenábar co-wrote the screenplay with Alejandro Hernández. It comprises 6 episodes each with a running time of around 45 minutes. Movistar+ released the series in Spain, while AMC handled broadcast in the US, Canada, the Caribbean and Latin America.

After 5 months of shooting, the part of the filming located in Spain was wrapped up in January 2021. Shooting locations in Spain included the Madrid region (including the Moncloa Palace), the province of Cádiz (including La Línea, Algeciras and Naval Station Rota), Guadalajara, A Coruña and Zaragoza. Filming wrapped in Spain on 27 April 2021. In August 2021, Movistar+ announced the premiere date of the first two episodes, slated for 30 September 2021. The series was presented by Amenábar at the 69th San Sebastián International Film Festival.

Awards and nominations  

|-
| align = "center" rowspan = "3" | 2021 || rowspan = "3" | 27th Forqué Awards || colspan = "2" | Best Fiction Series ||  || rowspan = "3" | 
|-
| Best Actress (TV series) || Ana Polvorosa || 
|-
| Best Actor (TV series) || Álvaro Mel || 
|-
| align = "center" | 2022 || 30th Actors and Actresses Union Awards || Best Television Actor in a Secondary Role || Karra Elejalde ||  || 
|}

See also 
 Nuestra Señora de las Mercedes

References

External links 
 

Movistar+ network series
Spanish television miniseries
2020s Spanish drama television series
Television shows filmed in Spain
Television shows based on comics
2021 Spanish television series debuts
2021 Spanish television series endings
Spanish-language television shows
Television series by MOD Producciones